Fred Hovey defeated the two-time defending champion Robert Wrenn in the challenge round, 6–3, 6–2, 6–4 to win the men's singles tennis title at the 1895 U.S. National Championships.

Sixtееn-year-old Dwight F. Davis, who was to introduce the Davis Cup in 1900, took part in  competition for the first time; he lost in the first round in four sets.

Draw

Challenge round

Finals

Earlier rounds

Section 1

Section 2

Section 3

Section 4

Section 5

Section 6

Section 7

Section 8

References 
 

Men's singles
1895